Sumio Harada (born 1960) is a Japanese wildlife photographer, author, public speaker, and conservationist.

Early life 
Harada was born in 1960 in Japan. His interest in photography began when he joined his high school's photography club at the age of 16.  Harada attended the Tokyo University of Agriculture where he studied biology. It was during this period of time when Harada began photographing the serow, a distant relative of mountain goats.

Personal life 
In 1994, Harada relocated to West Glacier, Montana with his wife Kumi and daughter Moyu. In 2005, Harada was granted U.S. permanent resident status. Today, Harada lives in Coram, MT with his wife Kumi.

Career 
In 1987 Harada began photographing mountain goats in the Canadian Rockies. In 1994, he relocated to Northwest Montana to focus on photographing mountain goats inside Glacier National Park. In 1995, his work was first widely circulated when his photographs were published in an issue of National Geographic. 

In 2008 Harada published his first wildlife photography book Mountain Goats of Glacier National Park which documents the seasonal change of mountain goats. 

The following year, in 2009 he published his first DVD titled The Breaths of Glacier, which showcases the 4 seasons throughout Glacier National Park.

In 2016 he published his latest book Wild Harmony of Glacier National Park which took 8 years to create and focuses on the unique ecosystem that mountain goats belong to. 

Harada has more recently decided to shoot videos in order to document the entire life cycle of mountain goats in Glacier National Park. Outside of his books his images have been published in National Wildlife, Geo, Canadian Wildlife, Ranger Rick, Montana Magazine, and National Geographic.

See also 

 Nature photography
 Conservation photography

References 

1960 births
Living people
Japanese photographers
Nature photographers